The One Hundred Twenty-eighth Ohio General Assembly was the legislative body of the state of Ohio from January 5, 2009, until December 31, 2010. Ted Strickland was Ohio Governor for its entirety.  It was composed of the Ohio Senate and the Ohio House of Representatives.  The apportionment of districts was based on the 2000 United States census.  It marked the first time in fourteen years that the Ohio Democratic Party controlled the House of Representatives, while the Ohio Republican Party maintained control of the Ohio Senate.

Party summary

Senate

House of Representatives

Leadership

Senate

 President of the Senate: Bill Harris
 President pro tempore of the Senate: Tom Niehaus
 Floor Leader: Keith Faber
 Whip: Mark Wagoner (January 2009-January 2010); Steve Buehrer (January 2010-December 2010)
 Minority Leader: Capri Cafaro
 Assistant Minority Leader: Shirley Smith
 Minority Whip: Ray Miller
 Assistant Minority Whip: Jason Wilson

House of Representatives

 Speaker of the House: Armond Budish
 President pro tempore of the Senate: Matt Szollosi
 Majority Floor Leader: Tracy Maxwell Heard
 Assistant Majority Floor Leader: Allan Sayre
 Majority Whip: Jay Goyal
 Assistant Majority Whip: Linda Bolon
 Minority Leader: William G. Batchelder
 Assistant Minority Leader: Lou Blessing
 Minority Whip: John Adams
 Assistant Minority Whip: Cheryl Grossman

Membership

Senate

House of Representatives

Appt.- Member was appointed to current House Seat

Changes in membership

Senate
There were three resignations and one death.

House of Representatives
There were seven resignations.

See also
 List of Ohio state legislatures

References
Ohio House of Representatives official website
Project Vote Smart - State House of Ohio
Map of Ohio House Districts
Ohio District Maps 2002-2012

Ohio legislative sessions
2009 U.S. legislative sessions
2010 U.S. legislative sessions
2009 in Ohio
2010 in Ohio

de:Repräsentantenhaus von Ohio